FRJ may refer to:

 Afrijet Airlines, a former Nigerian airline, ICAO code
 Frejus Airport, a former airport in France, IATA code

See also

 FRJ-2 nuclear research reactor
 frjj (Furong Jiejie; b.1977), Internet poster